The 1968 Haringey Council election took place on 9 May 1968 to elect members of Haringey London Borough Council in London, England. The whole council was up for election and the Conservative party gained overall control of the council.

Background

Election result

|}

Ward results

Alexandra-Bowes

R. A. Penton was a sitting councillor for Park ward.

Bruce Grove

Central Hornsey

Coleraine

C. D. Moss was a sitting councillor for Noel Park ward.

Crouch End

Fortis Green

C. Hannington was a sitting councillor for Stroud Green ward.

Green Lanes

High Cross

Highgate

Muswell Hill

Noel Park

Mrs D. C. Findley was a sitting councillor for Alexandra-Bowes ward.
L. A. Vitoria was a sitting councillor for Town Hall ward.

Park

Mrs L. A. Angell was a sitting councillor for Noel Park ward.

Seven Sisters

South Hornsey

Mrs L. H. Lipson was a sitting councillor for West Green ward.

South Tottenham

Stroud Green

Tottenham Central

Town Hall

Turnpike

West Green

References

1968
1968 London Borough council elections